Cyd Hayman (born 1 May 1944, in Chippenham, Wiltshire) is an English actress.

She appeared in the films: Percy (1971), Rogue Male (1976), The Human Factor (1979), The Godsend (1980) and Mask of Murder (1985).

Her television credits include Adam Adamant Lives!, The Two Ronnies, Manhunt, Clochemerle, The Persuaders!, The Lotus Eaters, Special Branch, Space: 1999, Tales of the Unexpected and Lame Ducks.

Filmography
 Percy (1971)
 Rogue Male (1976)
 The Human Factor (1979)
 The Godsend (1980)
 Mask of Murder (1985)

References

External links
 

1944 births
Living people
English stage actresses
English film actresses
English television actresses
People from Chippenham